William I KG ( 1392 – 25 July 1482), called the Victorious, a member of the House of Welf, was Duke of Brunswick-Lüneburg. He was reigning Prince of Lüneburg from 1416 to 1428 and of Brunswick-Wolfenbüttel from 1428 to 1432, counted either as William III or William IV. From 1432 he ruled over the newly established Principality of Calenberg, from 1463 also over the Principality of Göttingen. In 1473 he stepped down in favour of his sons, to assume the rule in Brunswick-Wolfenbüttel.

Life
William was the eldest son of the Brunswick duke Henry the Mild from his first marriage with Sophia, daughter of the Griffin duke Wartislaw IV of Pomerania. Upon his father's death in 1416, he inherited the Brunswick Principality of Lüneburg which he ruled jointly with his younger half-brother Henry the Peaceful. William turned out to be an energetic ruler; he soon entered into numerous feuds with neighbouring princes such as the Archbishop of Bremen and the Bishop of Hildesheim, and supported the Counts of Schauenburg and Holstein in their fight against King Eric of Denmark. He also fought with Margrave Frederick of Meissen defeating the Hussite forces in the 1421 Battle of Brüx.

In 1428 William and Henry swapped Lüneburg with their uncle Duke Bernard I, for the Principality of Brunswick-Wolfenbüttel and the later Calenberg territory stretching from the Deister hill range to the Leine river. However, while again on a campaign in 1432, William was deposed by his brother. After fierce fratricidal warfare, Henry retained Wolfenbüttel while William was compensated with the territory west of the River Leine, separated from the rest of the duchy by the Prince-Bishopric of Hildesheim. These lands were to become known as the Principality of Calenberg (Fürstentum Calenberg), named after William's residence at Calenberg Castle and eventually raised to the Electorate of Hanover centuries later.

When the Brunswick princes of Göttingen became extinct with the death of Duke Otto the One-Eyed in 1463, William was able to take over their principality. After Henry the Peaceful died without sons in 1473, William had control of both parts of Brunswick-Wolfenbüttel again; he then ceded the smaller Calenberg and Göttingen principalities to his sons Frederick III and William the Younger.

Family
In Berlin between 30 May/6 June 1423, William married firstly Cecilia (c. 1405 – 1449), daughter of the Hohenzollern elector Frederick I of Brandenburg. They had two sons:
 Frederick the Turbulent (c. 1424 – 1495), succeeded his father as Duke of Brunswick-Lüneburg and ruling Prince of Wolfenbüttel in 1482, deposed in 1484;
 William the Younger (c. 1425 – 1503), succeeded his father as Duke of Brunswick-Lüneburg in 1482 and ruling Prince of Calenberg and Göttingen in 1482; sole ruler of Wolfenbüttel, Calenberg and Göttingen from 1484; ceded Wolfenbüttel to his son Henry the Younger in 1495.

In 1466, William married secondly Matilda of Holstein-Schauenburg, daughter of Count Otto II of Schauenburg-Pinneberg, and widow of Duke Bernard II of Brunswick-Lüneburg (d. 1464). Matilda died in Neustadt am Rübenberge on 22 July 1468, two days after giving birth a short-lived son, Otto (1468–1471).

Ancestors

References
 Zedlers Universal-Lexicon, vol. 56, pp. 581–584
 William the Victorious of Lüneburg, Duke of Lüneburg at www3.dcs.hull.ac.uk.
 Wilhelm (William) "The Victorious" (1400–1482) at www.gwleibniz.com.

Princes of Calenberg
Princes of Göttingen
Princes of Lüneburg
Princes of Wolfenbüttel
1390s births
1482 deaths
Middle House of Brunswick
Burials at Brunswick Cathedral